Paola Zanni  (born 12 June 1977) is an Italian footballer who played as a defender for the Italy women's national football team. She was part of the team at the 1999 FIFA Women's World Cup.

References

External links
 

1977 births
Living people
Italian women's footballers
Italy women's international footballers
Place of birth missing (living people)
1999 FIFA Women's World Cup players
Women's association football defenders
ACF Milan players